The 1990 MAAC men's basketball tournament was held March 2–5 at Knickerbocker Arena in Albany, New York.

Top-seeded La Salle defeated  in the championship game, 71–61, to win their third MAAC men's basketball tournament.

The Explorers received an automatic bid to the 1990 NCAA tournament as the #4 seed in the East region.

Format
Ten of the conference's twelve members participated in the tournament field. Teams were seeded based on regular season conference records. The top two seeds received byes into the quarterfinals. All games were played at the new Knickerbocker Arena in Albany, New York.

Bracket

References

MAAC men's basketball tournament
1989–90 Metro Atlantic Athletic Conference men's basketball season
1990 in sports in New York (state)